Apollodorus was a tyrant of the ancient Greek city of Cassandreia (formerly Potidaea) in the peninsula of Pallene. He at first pretended to be a friend of the people, but when he had gained their confidence, he formed a conspiracy for the purpose of making himself tyrant, and bound his accomplices by most barbarous ceremonies described in Diodorus.

When Apollodorus had gained his object, about 279 BC, he began his tyrannical reign, which in cruelty, rapaciousness and debauchery has seldom been equalled in any country. The ancients mention him along with the most detestable tyrants that ever lived.

But notwithstanding the support which he derived from the Gauls, who were then penetrating southward, he was unable to maintain himself, and in 276 or 275 he was conquered with the help of the pirate Ameinias the Phocian and put to death by Antigonus II Gonatas.

Notes

References
The Biographical Dictionary, Volume 3

3rd-century BC Greek people
Ancient Greek tyrants
3rd-century BC rulers
3rd-century BC Macedonians
270s BC deaths